In enzymology, a 4-hydroxybenzoate 4-O-beta-D-glucosyltransferase is an enzyme that catalyzes the chemical reaction

UDP-glucose + 4-hydroxybenzoate  UDP + 4-(beta-D-glucosyloxy)benzoate

Thus, the two substrates of this enzyme are UDP-glucose and 4-hydroxybenzoate, whereas its two products are UDP and 4-(beta-D-glucosyloxy)benzoate.

This enzyme belongs to the family of glycosyltransferases, specifically the hexosyltransferases.  The systematic name of this enzyme class is UDP-glucose:4-hydroxybenzoate 4-O-beta-D-glucosyltransferase. Other names in common use include uridine diphosphoglucose-4-hydroxybenzoate glucosyltransferase, UDP-glucose:4-(beta-D-glucopyranosyloxy)benzoic acid, glucosyltransferase, HBA glucosyltransferase, p-hydroxybenzoate glucosyltransferase, PHB glucosyltransferase, and PHB-O-glucosyltransferase.

References

 

EC 2.4.1
Enzymes of unknown structure